Tammy Barr is an American actress, model and voice over talent.  She is best known for portraying the character young Patty Williams in flashback scenes on The Young and the Restless . She made her screen debut in Richard III alongside David Carradine and also played the wife of Mark Cuban in his sketch spoof The Cubans. Her first leading role in a film was opposite Lorenzo Lamas in the thriller Backstabber. She played the wife of Daniel Baldwin in A Little Christmas Business and was a Looping Artist on the Terrence Malick film, Red Wing.

References

External links
 

Living people
21st-century American actresses
American film actresses
Year of birth missing (living people)
Place of birth missing (living people)